The American School in Taichung (AST) is an international school in Taichung, Taiwan offering grades one to twelve. The school, founded in 1989, was previously known as Lincoln American School.  It is fully accredited by the Western Association of Schools and Colleges (WASC) and hosts the annual Taiwan Model United Nations (TAIMUN) conference, which is attended by schools from across Taiwan and Asia. One of the school's founders, Anna Lee, is a daughter of former President Lee Teng-hui. The school's current director is Dr. Colin Brown.

History
In 1989, Anna Lee and Esther Hanna established a new American school for expatriates' children in Taichung. The school was located in a town house with three bedrooms. Due to its limited resources and facilities, the officers of the Ministry of Education (MOE) and the American Institute in Taiwan (AIT) were hesitant before agreeing to establish the school. Eventually, the school moved outside what were at the time the city limits of Taichung, into an area that would become the Dakeng Nature Reserve. This location ensures that the area surrounding the school will not become urbanized, thus preserving the existing ecosystem that proves beneficial to supervised student exploration and scientific study. A new gym was added to the school campus on August 8, 2013.

Academics
The required courses at American School in Taichung are English, Mathematics, Science, History, Physical Education and two years of a Foreign Language (Spanish or Chinese). AST also has drama, art, and music programs (choir ensemble, violin, and hand bells). There are two concerts during the year, one in the spring and one in the winter. Currently (as of the 2012-2013 school year), AST offers eight Advanced Placement courses: AP Statistics, AP Biology, AP US History, AP Calculus AB, AP Literature, AP Chinese, AP Physics and AP Language.

Sports and clubs
Athletics
American School in Taichung offers many sports for both middle school and high school boys and girls,  including: volleyball, soccer, softball, basketball, and cross country. The AST teams participate in tournaments that involve other international and bilingual schools on the island.

Organizations
Activities and organizations vary from year to year, but consistently include the following:

Middle School:
Student Government (STUGO), Middle School Model United Nations (MUN), participating in TASMUN and other Taiwan-based MUN conferences, Carnival, Camp Taiwan, Robotics, and Drama.

High School:
Student Government (STUGO), Model United Nations (THIMUN-Singapore, IASAS MUN, and TAIMUN, which is hosted at AST)

Model United Nations (MUN)
AST has successfully developed an MUN program, Taiwan Model United Nations (TAIMUN). TAIMUN was begun in 2005, and is organized by all high school students at the American School in Taichung, though not every student acts as a delegate; students not acting as delegates participate in administrative and press teams. Schools from across Taiwan and Asia attend AST's TAIMUN Conference. AST has also attended MUN events in Singapore, Russia, China, and Greece.

Robotics Club - Team AST-onishing.
AST has recently added robotics elective classes to the middle school(2017) and high school(2019).  Members from the AST robotics club were the FIRST LEGO League Champions in 2019 Into Orbit competition, they went on to represent Taiwan at the FLL International Open, Ismir, Turkey where they placed 2nd in the Mechanical Design category.  They have also qualified for the VEX World Championship in 2019 and 2020.

See also
 Taipei European School
 Hsinchu American School
 Morrison Academy
 Dominican International School
 Kaohsiung American School
 Taipei Japanese School
 Taipei Adventist American School
 Taiwan Adventist International School
 The Primacy Collegiate Academy

References

External links
 IASAS MUN

1989 establishments in Taiwan
American international schools in Taiwan
Educational institutions established in 1989
International schools in Taichung